The G&SWR 45 Class were 0-6-2T steam locomotives designed by Peter Drummond for the Glasgow and South Western Railway (G&SWR) of which 18 were built in 1915-1917, followed by a further 10 of a slightly modified design in 1919 after Robert Whitelegg took over as Chief Mechanical Engineer.

History
The G&SWR had historically made relatively little use of tank engines, and those which it owned in 1915 were exclusively small locomotives for shunting or suburban passenger services.  However, Drummond's tenure as Locomotive Superintendent was a time of considerable change for G&SWR locomotive design and the 45 Class marked a departure from previous practice, as they were built for goods and mineral traffic which had previously used tender engines such as 0-6-0s. They were particularly associated with the Ayrshire coalfield, and were thus a Scottish equivalent to the many Welsh 0-6-2T locomotives employed on similar duties in the South Wales valleys.  Their design had many similarities to the Highland Railway X Class 0-6-4Ts which Drummond had built for his previous employer.  The Whitelegg engines of 1919 had slightly increased water tank capacity and some minor detail changes, most obviously to the shape of the cabside cutouts, and were employed on similar traffic.  Shortly prior to these entering service the entire G&SWR locomotive fleet had been renumbered, and the type now became known as the 1 Class under the new numbering system.

The locomotives were much more successful than some of Drummond's earlier designs for the G&SWR, although their limited water tankage compared to tender engines became a problem after they passed into London, Midland and Scottish Railway (LMS) ownership in 1923. The LMS wanted to increase the loads which former G&SWR locomotives were permitted to haul, and whilst the 0-6-2Ts were capable of hauling heavier trains they lacked sufficient water capacity to complete longer journeys. They were therefore redeployed to shunting and short-distance trip workings, and the class became quite widely dispersed.  By the time withdrawals commenced in 1936 some examples were allocated to Carlisle, Workington and various former Midland Railway depots elsewhere in England.  One even spent some years banking on the Highland Main Line.  During World War II the surviving locomotives were all returned to the former G&SWR system.

Only one, no. 16905, survived into British Railways (BR) ownership in 1948 and this was withdrawn the same year without receiving its BR number.  Four locomotives were sold into industrial service and the last survivor was the former LMS 16908 which worked at Ashington Colliery until 1955. All were scrapped.

Numbering and locomotive histories
The class was originally designated 45 Class but, after the G&SWR's 1919 renumbering, this was changed to 1 Class. The LMS initially numbered them 16400-16427 but in 1926 changed this to 16900-16927 to make space for new LMS 3F 0-6-0Ts.

References

 
 

0-6-2T locomotives
045
NBL locomotives
Railway locomotives introduced in 1915
Standard gauge steam locomotives of Great Britain
Scrapped locomotives